CyberFlix Incorporated was a computer game company founded in 1993 by Bill Appleton. CyberFlix was based in Knoxville, Tennessee. They made many interactive story-telling games in the 1990s, but stopped any and all productions in 1998 before finally going out of business in 2006.

Two of its best known games were Titanic: Adventure Out of Time and Dust: A Tale of the Wired West.
CyberFlix also released the games Skull Cracker, Redjack: Revenge of the Brethren, Power Rangers Zeo vs. the Machine Empire, Lunicus, and Jump Raven.

CyberFlix's founder, Bill Appleton, is famous for his work with the SuperCard development environment and for the early World Builder adventure game production system. He also founded a company called DreamFactory Software in 1998. DreamFactory Software kept the trade mark for CyberFlix registered until November 25, 2006.

References

External links
 
 

Companies based in Knoxville, Tennessee
Video game companies established in 1993
Video game companies disestablished in 2006
Defunct companies based in Tennessee
Defunct video game companies of the United States
Video game development companies